Gergő Iváncsik (born 30 November 1981) is a former Hungarian handballer who played for Telekom Veszprém and for the Hungarian national team. He retired from handball in 2017.

Career

Club
He started to play handball at the age of nine in the elementary school and later became a member of the Győri ETO FKC youth team. He made her senior debut for the Győr-based club in 1998.

The talented left winger quickly caught the eyes of Hungarian top club MKB Veszprém KC, and he was signed by the champions in 2000. Since then, Iváncsik won a number of various medals and trophies both on domestic and continental level, including the EHF Cup Winners' Cup title in 2008.

International
He won a gold medal at the European Youth Championship in 1999 and led the Hungarian national team to fourth place at the Junior World Championships in 2001. He made his full international debut against Austria on 26 October 2000. His first major tournament was the 2003 World Championship. He participated at further four World Championships (2007, 2009, 2011, 2013) and was present at seven European Championships (2004, 2006, 2008, 2010, 2012, 2014, 2016). He was also member of the Hungarian team that finished fourth at the 2004 Olympic Games and 2012 Olympic Games.

Personal
His father, Mihály Iváncsik is a former handball player, who has won the IHF Cup in 1986 and received silver medal on the World Cup in the same year.

He has two younger brothers, Tamás Iváncsik and Ádám Iváncsik. Both of them are professional handball players and Hungarian internationals.

He is married. His wife, Vera gave birth to a boy, Máté, on 3 February 2009, soon after Iváncsik returned from the World Championship. Their second son, Milán was born in March 2014.

Achievements
Nemzeti Bajnokság I:
Winner: 2001, 2002, 2003, 2004, 2005, 2006, 2008, 2009, 2010, 2011, 2012, 2013, 2014, 2015
Silver Medalist: 2007
Magyar Kupa:
Winner: 2002, 2003, 2004, 2005, 2007, 2009, 2010, 2011, 2012, 2013, 2014, 2015
Silver Medalist: 2006, 2008
EHF Champions League:
Finalist: 2002, 2015, 2016
Semifinalist: 2003, 2006, 2014, 2017
EHF Cup Winners' Cup:
Winner: 2008
EHF Champions Trophy:
Finalist: 2002, 2008

Individual awards
 Hungarian Handballer of the Year: 2010
   Golden Cross of the Cross of Merit of the Republic of Hungary (2012)

References

External links
Gergő Iváncsik player profile on MKB Veszprém KC official website 
Gergő Iváncsik career statistics at Worldhandball 

1981 births
Living people
Hungarian male handball players
Olympic handball players of Hungary
Handball players at the 2004 Summer Olympics
Handball players at the 2012 Summer Olympics
Sportspeople from Győr
Veszprém KC players